In business, employee raiding is the practice of inducing an employee to leave one employer and take up employment with another employer.

While not illegal itself, the practice is often associated with "other illegal business practices", like violating non-compete agreements, or stealing trade secrets. Employee raiding for the express propose of stealing trade secrets is illegal.

The purpose of employee raiding is usually to gain access to unique or rare knowledge or skills which the employee may possess. If done for this reason it can give the raider an competitive advantage.

Ethical and legal dilemmas over employee raiding arise from the conflict of interests between an employee's right to free access to the labour market, and an employer's right to protect knowledge and skills which it regards as company property.

Employers may attempt to protect themselves against the most damaging effects of employee raiding by inserting non-compete clauses into employment contracts.

See also
 Unfair competition
 Trade secrets
 Union raid
 Antipoaching

References

Ethically disputed working conditions
Recruitment